This is a list of events in animation in 2020.

Events

January
January 10:
 (The league of 5) from Ánima Estudios became the first animated film to be released in the 2020s.
 The first episode of The Owl House premiered on Disney Channel.
 January 17: Voice actor Hank Azaria announces he will no longer be voicing Apu Nahasapeemapetilon on The Simpsons, unless as stated by him, the show's producers find "some way to transition it or something."
 January 31: The second half of the final season of Bojack Horseman is released on Netflix.

February
 February 9: 92nd Academy Awards: 
 Toy Story 4, directed by Josh Cooley, Jonas Rivera and Mark Nielsen, produced by Pixar and the Walt Disney Company, wins the Academy Award for Best Animated Feature.
 Hair Love by Matthew A. Cherry and Karen Rupert Toliver wins the Academy Award for Best Animated Short Film.
 February 21: Glitch Techs premiered on Netflix.
 February 22: The final episodes of 101 Dalmatian Street are broadcast.
 February 29: Shirobako: The Movie is released in theatres in Japan.

March
 March 5: The Haunted House: Ghost Ball Double X the third season aired on Tooniverse in South Korea.
 March 8: The Simpsons episode "Screenless" premieres, guest starring film director Werner Herzog.
 March 22: The Simpsons episode "Highway to Well" premieres, guest starring film director Kevin Smith.
 March 27: The final episode of Steven Universe Future premieres on Cartoon Network, serving as the finale to the Steven Universe  franchise.

May
 May 17: The Simpsons episode "The Way of the Dog" premieres, guest starring Cate Blanchett.
 May 27: Looney Tunes Cartoons premieres on HBO Max as a tie-in to the app's launch.

June
 June 25: As a result of the George Floyd protests:
 Kristen Bell announces she will no longer voice the multiracial character Molly on Central Park.
 Jenny Slate announces she will no longer voice African-American character Missy Foreman-Greenwald on Big Mouth.
 June 27: As a result of the George Floyd protests:
 It is announced that all non-white characters in The Simpsons will no longer be voiced by white voice actors, as the entertainment industry and others take action in response to rekindled calls for racial equality.
 Mike Henry announces he will no longer voice African-American character Cleveland Brown from Family Guy, due to feeling that an actual African-American actor would be more qualified to do so.
 Actress Alison Brie expresses public regret of having voiced Asian character Diane Nguyen from Bojack Horseman.

August
 August 8: The Owl House episode "Enchanting Grom Fright" is released to universal critical acclaim as well as praise for having Disney's first LGBTQ protagonist.
 August 10:
 The second series of Bluey premieres to critical acclaim.
 Bluey began streaming internationally on Disney+ to universal critical acclaim from American critics and audiences.
 August 14: The SpongeBob Movie: Sponge on the Run is released in theatres in Canada.
 August 17: The second and final season of Glitch Techs premiered on Netflix.
 August 21: Elena of Avalor airs its final episode.
 August 28: Phineas and Ferb the Movie: Candace Against the Universe, is released on Disney+.
 August 29: The first-season finale of The Owl House titled "Young Blood, Old Souls" is broadcast.
 August 30: The 2020 reboot of Animaniacs announced their release date to be November 20, 2020. A behind-the-scenes video of Rob Paulsen, Tress MacNeille, Jess Harnell, and Maurice LaMarche is released on YouTube to celebrate the news.

September
 September 1: Elinor Wonders Why premieres on PBS Kids to generally positive reviews.
 September 5: We Bare Bears: The Movie premieres on Cartoon Network, this also serves as a series finale.
 September 9: Nickelodeon pulls the premiere of 'Made By Maddie' due to controversy over its similarities with Hair Love.
 September 14: The 300th episode of American Dad! is broadcast.
 September 24: Alex Désert replaces Hank Azaria as the voice of The Simpsons character Carl Carlson starting with the episode "Undercover Burns".
 September 25: YouTube star Arif Zahir replaces Mike Henry as the voice of Cleveland Brown in Family Guy.
 September 30: An hour-long South Park special titled "The Pandemic Special" is broadcast, which satirized the COVID-19 pandemic and other current events in 2020. It is also broadcast on MTV and MTV2.

October
October 2: Rainbow High premieres its first episode.
 October 4: The Simpsons episode "I, Carumbus" premieres, guest starring comedian and actor Michael Palin.
 October 10: The Ben 10 movie, "Ben 10 vs. The Universe: The Movie" premieres on Cartoon Network.
October 19: Apple TV+ will be its new home for Peanuts specials instead of airing it on TV.
October 23: The Frozen short, Once Upon a Snowman, premiered on Disney+, which follows Olaf's origin story during the first film.

November
 November 5: The SpongeBob Movie: Sponge on the Run releases on Netflix internationally, except for the U.S., Canada, and China.
November 7: The first episode of Pikwik Pack is broadcast on Disney Junior.
 November 15: The Simpsons episode "Podcast News" premieres, guest starring actors Morgan Fairchild, Christine Nangle and Stellan Skarsgård. This is the first episode that David X. Cohen wrote since he left the show in 1998.
November 17: The LEGO Star Wars Holiday Special premiered on Disney+.
November 20: The first season of the Animaniacs revival was released on Hulu to generally positive reviews.

December 
 December 5: Alan Becker releases "Animator vs Animation V" on YouTube.
 December 11: Wolfwalkers premieres on Apple TV+.
 December 14: Shrek is added to the National Film Registry.
 December 12: After more than 20 years on the air, PBS airs Caillou for the last time on the PBS Kids block.
 December 14: Hilda releases its second season on Netlfix to critical acclaim. A third season is in production, while the 85-minute movie special, Hilda and The Mountain King premiered December 30, 2021, serving as a continuation of the season 2 finale.
 December 25: Pixar's Soul premieres on Disney+.

Awards
 Academy Award for Best Animated Feature: Toy Story 4
 Academy Award for Best Animated Short Film: Hair Love	
 American Cinema Editors Award for Best Edited Animated Feature Film: Toy Story 4
 Annecy International Animated Film Festival Cristal du long métrage: I Lost My Body
 Annie Award for Best Animated Feature: Klaus
 Annie Award for Best Animated Feature — Independent: I Lost My Body
 Asia Pacific Screen Award for Best Animated Feature Film: Weathering with You
 BAFTA Award for Best Animated Film: Klaus
 César Award for Best Animated Film: Dilili in Paris
 Chicago Film Critics Association Award for Best Animated Film: Toy Story 4
 Critics' Choice Movie Award for Best Animated Feature: Toy Story 4
 Dallas–Fort Worth Film Critics Association Award for Best Animated Film: Toy Story 4
 European Film Award for Best Animated Feature Film: Buñuel in the Labyrinth of the Turtles
 Florida Film Critics Circle Award for Best Animated Film: I Lost My Body	
 Golden Globe Award for Best Animated Feature Film: Missing Link
 Golden Reel Awards: Toy Story 4
 Goya Award for Best Animated Film: Buñuel in the Labyrinth of the Turtles
 Japan Academy Film Prize for Animation of the Year: Weathering with You 
 Kids' Choice Award for Favorite Animated Movie: Frozen II
 Los Angeles Film Critics Association Award for Best Animated Film: I Lost My Body
 Mainichi Film Award for Best Animation Film: Children of the Sea
 National Board of Review Award for Best Animated Film: How to Train Your Dragon: The Hidden World
 New York Film Critics Circle Award for Best Animated Film: I Lost My Body
 Online Film Critics Society Award for Best Animated Film: Toy Story 4
 Producers Guild of America Award for Best Animated Motion Picture: Toy Story 4
 San Diego Film Critics Society Award for Best Animated Film: I Lost My Body
 San Francisco Film Critics Circle Award for Best Animated Feature: I Lost My Body
 Saturn Award for Best Animated Film: Spider-Man: Into the Spider-Verse
 St. Louis Gateway Film Critics Association Award for Best Animated Film: Toy Story 4
 Tokyo Anime Award: Weathering with You
 Toronto Film Critics Association Award for Best Animated Film: Missing Link
 Visual Effects Society Award for Outstanding Visual Effects in an Animated Feature: Missing Link
 Washington D.C. Area Film Critics Association Award for Best Animated Feature: Toy Story 4

Films released

 January 9 - Masameer the Movie (Saudi Arabia)
 January 10:
 The Island of Giant Insects (Japan)
 La liga de los 5 (Mexico)
 January 11 - Guangyu, God of War (China)
 January 17:
 The Hero Battle (China)
 Made in Abyss: Dawn of the Deep Soul (Japan)
 January 18 - High School Fleet: The Movie (Japan)
 January 24 - Ella Bella Bingo (Norway)
 January 27 - The Nose or the Conspiracy of Mavericks (Russia)
 February 1 - Goblin Slayer: Goblin's Crown (Japan)
 February 6 - Dreambuilders (Denmark)
 February 7 - Lur eta Amets (Spain)
 February 14:
 ACCA: 13-Territory Inspection Dept. – Regards (Japan)
 Sonic the Hedgehog (United States, Japan and Canada)
 February 15 - Saezuru Tori wa Habatakanai – The Clouds Gather (Japan)
 February 19 - Raggie (Estonia and Denmark)
 February 21:
 Digimon Adventure: Last Evolution Kizuna (Japan)
 Sekai-ichi Hatsukoi: Propose-hen (Japan)
 February 22 - Kill It and Leave This Town (Poland)
 February 25:
 Homeward (United States)
 Norm of the North: Family Vacation (United States and India)
 Superman: Red Son (United States)
 February 27 - The Wishmas Tree (Australia)
 February 29 - Shirobako: The Movie (Japan)
 March 6 - Onward (United States)
 March 8 - Sitara: Let Girls Dream (Pakistan)
 March 12 - Cranston Academy: Monster Zone (Mexico, United States, United Kingdom and Canada)
 March 19 - Altered Carbon: Resleeved (Japan and United States)
 March 25 - Punyakoti (India)
 March 27 - Psycho-Pass 3: First Inspector (Japan)
 April 10 - Trolls World Tour (United States)
 April 14 - Mortal Kombat Legends: Scorpion's Revenge (United States)
 April 22 - The Willoughbys (United States)
 April 28 - Lego DC: Shazam!: Magic and Monsters (United States)
 May 5 - Justice League Dark: Apokolips War (United States)
 May 15 - Scoob! (United States)
 May 29 - 100% Wolf (Australia)
 June 15:
 Accidental Luxuriance of the Translucent Watery Rebus (Croatia)
 Ginger's Tale (Russia)
 Jungle Beat: The Movie (Mauritius, South Africa and United Kingdom)
 Nahuel and the Magic Book (Chile and Brazil)
 True North (Indonesia and Japan)
 June 18 - A Whisker Away (Japan)
 June 28 - Calamity, a Childhood of Martha Jane Cannary (France and Denmark)
 June 30 - We Bare Bears: The Movie (United States)
 July 9 - Berry and Dolly - Fairy Cards (Hungary)
 July 25 - Words Bubble Up Like Soda Pop (Japan)
 July 31:
 Mr.Miao (China)
 Pat & Mat (China)
 August 4:
 Deathstroke: Knights & Dragons: The Movie (United States)
 The Swan Princess: A Royal Wedding (United States)
 August 5 - Bigfoot Family (Belgium)
 August 7:
 Doraemon: Nobita's New Dinosaur (Japan)
 Revue Starlight Rondo Rondo Rondo (Japan)
 August 12 - Yakari, A Spectacular Journey (France and Germany)
 August 14:
 Date A Bullet: Dead or Bullet (Japan)
 Fearless (Canada and United States)
 Octonauts & the Caves of Sac Actun (United Kingdom and Canada)
 The SpongeBob Movie: Sponge on the Run (United States)
 August 15 - Fate/stay night: Heaven's Feel III. spring song (Japan)
 August 21 - The Juvenile of King Yu (China)
 August 22 - Given (Japan)
 August 23 - Superman: Man of Tomorrow (United States)
 August 24 - Avera and the mystical Kingdom 2 (China)
 August 28 - Phineas and Ferb the Movie: Candace Against the Universe (United States)
 August 29 - Alibaba and the Magic Lamp (China)
 September 1 - Barbie: Princess Adventure (United States)
 September 2 - Oresuki: Game Over (Japan)
 September 3 - A Costume for Nicholas (Mexico)
 September 5 - "Hataraku Saibō!!" Saikyō no Teki, Futatabi. Karada no Naka wa "Chō" Ōsawagi! (Japan)
 September 8 - Curious George: Go West, Go Wild (United States)
 September 9:
 Beauty Water (South Korea)
 The Old Man and Two Mountains (China)
 September 11:
 Crayon Shin-chan: Crash! Rakuga Kingdom and Almost Four Heroes (Japan)
 L'étranger de la Plage (Japan)
 The Magnificent Kotobuki Complete Edition (Japan)
 September 17 - Jumper. Treasure Hunting 3D (Russia and Kazhakstan)
 September 18:
 Love Me, Love Me Not (Japan)
 Violet Evergarden: The Movie (Japan)
 September 24 - Space Dogs: Return to Earth (Russia)
 September 25:
 My Favorite War (Norway and Latvia)
 Two Buddies and a Badger: The Great Big Beast (Norway)
 September 26 - Victor_Robot (Ukraine)
 September 30 - Josep (France, Belgium and Spain)
 October 1:
 Dragon Rider (United Kingdom and Germany)
 Jiang Ziya: Legend Of Deification (China)
 October 2:
 BEM: Become Human (Japan)
 Burn the Witch (Japan)
 Casa: Perros vs. Aliens (Spain)
 Wave!!: Let's Go Surfing!! (Japan)
 October 3 - Kung Fu Mulan (China)
 October 6 - Happy Halloween, Scooby Doo! (United States)
 October 10 - Ben 10 Versus the Universe: The Movie (United States)
 October 13:
 Batman: Death in the Family (United States)
 Octonauts & the Great Barrier Reef (United Kingdom and Canada)
 October 15 - Combat Wombat (Australia)
 October 16:
 Demon Slayer: Kimetsu no Yaiba – The Movie: Mugen Train (Japan)
 Wave!!: Let's Go Surfing!! Part 2 (Japan)
 October 21 - Little Vampire (France)
 October 23:
 Happy-Go-Lucky Days (Japan)
 Over the Moon (United States and China)
 Salute to the Heroes (China)
 October 24 - Son of Dragon God (China)
 October 29 - You Animal! (Philippines)
 October 30 - Wave!!: Let's Go Surfing!! Part 3 (Japan)
 October 31 - Pretty Cure Miracle Leap: A Wonderful Day with Everyone (Japan)
 November 1 - China Panda (China)
 November 6:
 Christmas at Cattle Hill (Norway)
 Monster Strike The Movie: Lucifer Zetsubō no Yoake (Japan)
 November 12 - El Camino de Xico (Mexico)
 November 13:
 Date A Bullet: Nightmare or Queen (Japan)
 Looking for Magical Doremi (Japan)
 November 20:
 Alien Xmas (United States)
 A Christmas Carol (United Kingdom)
 Stand by Me Doraemon 2 (Japan)
 November 25 - The Croods: A New Age  (United States)
 November 27:
 Grisaia: Phantom Trigger the Animation Stargazer (Japan)
 Kimi wa Kanata (Japan)
 November 28 - Kud Wafter (Japan)
 December 1 - Angela's Christmas Wish (Ireland)
 December 2 - Wolfwalkers (Ireland and United States)
 December 3 - Magic Arch 3D (Russia, Hungary and United States)
 December 5 - Fate/Grand Order: Camelot – Wandering; Agaterám (Japan)
 December 8 - Bobbleheads: The Movie (United States)
 December 9 - Marudase Kintarō (Japan)
 December 11:
 Lady Buckit and the Motley Mopsters (Nigeria)
 The Red Scroll (Brazil)
 Yes, No, or Maybe? (Japan)
 December 21 - Battle of Pressburg (Hungary)
 December 24 - Barkers: Mind the Cats! (Russia)
 December 25:
 Josee, the Tiger and the Fish (Japan)
 Pokémon the Movie: Secrets of the Jungle (Japan)
 Poupelle of Chimney Town (Japan)
 Soul (United States)
 December 30 - Earwig and the Witch (Japan)
 December 31 - Horse Julius and Big Horse Racing (Russia)
 Specific date unknown - The Orbit of Minor Satellites (United States)

Television series debuts

Television series endings

Deaths

January
 January 2: John Baldessari, American conceptual artist (voiced himself in The Simpsons episode "3 Scenes Plus a Tag from a Marriage"), dies at age 88.
 January 5:
 Denise Blakely Fuller, American background artist (Walt Disney Animation Studios, Jackie Chan Adventures, Coconut Fred's Fruit Salad Island) and matte painter (Toy Story 3, Brave, Hotel Transylvania, Cloudy with a Chance of Meatballs 2, The Book of Life), dies at age 52.
 Blair Kitchen, Canadian animator (Nelvana, Titan A.E., Anne of Green Gables: The Animated Series, The Abrafaxe – Under The Black Flag, Osmosis Jones, The Ripping Friends, Kronk's New Groove, Curious George, Busytown Mysteries, Cuppa Coffee Studios, Looney Tunes Cartoons) and storyboard artist (Hoze Houndz, Nelvana, Johnny Test, The Book of Life, Trollhunters: Tales of Arcadia, Welcome to the Wayne, Ferdinand, Next Gen, Maya and the Three), dies at age 43.
 January 9: Yūji Yamaguchi, Japanese animator (Fate/stay night), dies at an unknown age.
 January 14: Jacques Toll, French animator and comics artist, dies at an unknown age.
 January 21: Terry Jones, Welsh-English actor, comedian, writer and film director (occasional voices in Terry Gilliam's animated shorts in Monty Python's Flying Circus and the film spin-offs, co-creator of Blazing Dragons), dies at age 77.
 January 23: Marsha Kramer, American actress (additional voices in Antz, Ice Age, Jimmy Neutron: Boy Genius, The Simpsons Movie, The Lego Movie and The SpongeBob Movie: Sponge Out of Water), dies at age 74. January 24: Zsolt Richly, Hungarian animator (Pannonia Film Studio, A Kockásfülű nyúl), dies at age 78.
 January 25: Horst Alisch, German illustrator, comics artist and animator, dies at age 94.
 January 26: Kobe Bryant, American professional basketball player (wrote and narrated Dear Basketball, voiced himself in The Proud Family episode "One in a Million"), dies at age 41.
 January 27: Jack Burns, American comedian and actor (voice of Ralph Kane in Wait Till Your Father Gets Home, Sid the Squid in Animaniacs, Edward Christian in The Simpsons episode "Beyond Blunderdome"), dies at age 86.
 January 30: Fred Silverman, American television executive and producer (Scooby-Doo, Where Are You!, Mighty Orbots, Piggsburg Pigs!, creator of Meatballs & Spaghetti), dies from cancer at age 82.

February
 February 3: Philippe Adamov, French illustrator, animator and comics artist (Gandahar), dies at age 63.
 February 5: Kirk Douglas, American actor (voice of Chester J. Lampwick in The Simpsons episode "The Day the Violence Died"), dies at age 103.
 February 7: Orson Bean, American actor (voice of Bilbo Baggins in The Hobbit, and Frodo Baggins in The Return of the King, Billy Rabbit in Garfield in the Rough, Geppetto in the Tiny Toon Adventures episode "Fairy Tales for the 90's"), dies in a traffic collision at age 91.
 February 8: Ron McLarty, American actor, playwright and novelist (voice of Papa Bear and the Narrator in The Berenstain Bears specials, the General in Courage the Cowardly Dog), dies from dementia at age 72.
 February 13: Yoshisada Sakaguchi, Japanese actor (voice of Philip II of Macedon in Reign, Muijika in Mushishi, Hachiroh Tohbe in Jin-Roh: The Wolf Brigade, Tonpetty in JoJo's Bizarre Adventure: Phantom Blood), dies at age 80.
 February 16:
 Zoe Caldwell, Australian-American actress (voice of the Grand Councilwoman in Lilo & Stitch), dies at age 86.
 Jason Davis, American actor (voice of Mikey Blumberg in Recess), dies at age 35.
 Maureen Mlynarczyk, American animation timer (Film Roman, Warner Bros. Animation, Disney Television Animation, Cartoon Network Studios, Rough Draft Studios), dies at age 47.
 February 17: Ja'Net DuBois, American actress and singer (voice of Mrs. Avery in The PJs, Mrs. Patterson in As Told by Ginger, Grams Hinton in the G.I. Joe: Renegades episode "Cousins"), dies from cardiac arrest at age 74.
 February 21:
 Nicola Cuti, American comic book artist, animator (Defenders of the Earth, Barbie and the Rockers: Out of This World, BraveStarr, Disney Television Animation, The Brothers Flub), art director (Exosquad) and background artist (Double Dragon, Problem Child, The Critic, Street Fighter, Biker Mice from Mars, RoboCop: Alpha Commando, Dilbert, The Cramp Twins), dies at age 75.
 Hisashi Katsuta, Japanese actor (voice of Professor Ochanomizu in Astro Boy, Dr. Hoshi in Astroganger, Professor Tobishima in Groizer X, Shin'ichirō Izumi in Tōshō Daimos, dies at age 92.
 February 22: Kazuhiko Kishino, Japanese actor (voice of Mayumi Kinniku in Kinnikuman), dies at age 86.
 February 29:
 Luis Alfonso Mendoza, Mexican actor (dub voice of Gohan in Dragon Ball Z and Dragon Ball GT, Leonardo in Teenage Mutant Ninja Turtles), was murdered at age 55.
 Alfred Budnick, American animator (Hanna-Barbera) and background artist (Hanna-Barbera, The Nine Lives of Fritz the Cat, Filmation, Camp Candy, Garfield and Friends, Family Dog, The Critic, Hey Arnold!, Hey Arnold!: The Movie, Party Wagon), dies at age 81.

March
 March 2: James Lipton, American writer, lyricist and actor (voice of The Director in Bolt, voiced himself in The Simpsons episodes "The Sweetest Apu" and "Homer the Father"), dies from bladder cancer at age 93.
 March 3: David Wise, American television scriptwriter (Star Trek: The Animated Series, The Transformers, Teenage Mutant Ninja Turtles, Chip 'n Dale: Rescue Rangers, Batman: The Animated Series), dies at age 65.
 March 8: Max von Sydow, Swedish-French actor (voice of Klaus Ziegler in The Simpsons episode "The Art of War"), dies at age 90.
 March 10: Curtis Cim, American animator (Hanna-Barbera, Filmation, Zodiac Entertainment, King of the Hill, My Little Pony: A Very Minty Christmas) and storyboard artist (Calico Entertainment, King of the Hill, Warner Bros. Animation, Dragon Tales, Courage the Cowardly Dog, Scooby-Doo and the Cyber Chase, The Wild Thornberrys, As Told by Ginger, Clifford's Puppy Days, The Land Before Time, Curious George, Care Bears: Oopsy Does It!, My Little Pony: Twinkle Wish Adventure, Angelina Ballerina: The Next Steps), dies at age 65.
 March 19: Román Arámbula, Mexican comic book artist, animator (Hanna-Barbera), storyboard artist (Tubby the Tuba, TaleSpin, Little Shop, Attack of the Killer Tomatoes, Madeline, Warner Bros. Animation, Problem Child, 101 Dalmatians: The Series) and sheet timer (King of the Hill), dies at age 83.
 March 20: Giovanni Romanini, Italian animator and comics artist, dies from a heart attack at age 75.
 March 24:
 Juan Padrón, Cuban comics artist and animator (Vampires in Havana), dies at age 73.
 Albert Uderzo, French comics artist (creative advisor and designer for the Astérix animated films Asterix and Cleopatra and The 12 Tasks of Asterix), dies from a heart attack at age 92.
 William Dufris, American actor and audiobook narrator (voice of the title character in Bob the Builder), dies from cancer at age 62.
 March 29: Ken Shimura, Japanese comedian (voice of Master Nyada in Yo-kai Watch: The Movie, dub voice of the title character in The Lorax), dies from COVID-19 at age 70.
 March 31:
 Julie Bennett, American actress (voice of Penelope Pussycat in Louvre Come Back to Me!, Cindy Bear in Yogi Bear, Aunt May in seasons 4 and 5 of Spider-Man), dies from COVID-19 at age 88.
 Vincent Marzello, American actor (voice of Farmer Pickles and Robert in Bob the Builder), dies at age 68.

April
 April 1: Adam Schlesinger, American musician, songwriter, composer (TV Funhouse) and record producer (performed the theme songs of T.U.F.F. Puppy, Supernoobs and Johnny Test), dies from COVID-19 at age 52.
 April 2: Pamela Ross, American production manager (Doug, 101 Dalmatians: The Series, The Cramp Twins) and producer (Time Warp Trio, Tutenstein), dies at age 55.
 April 11: Paul Haddad, Canadian actor (voice of Uncle Arthur in Babar, Quicksilver and Arkon in X-Men, Lefty in John Callahan's Quads!, Willy Stop in Rescue Heroes), dies at age 56.
 April 12:
 Keiji Fujiwara, Japanese actor (voice of Maes Hughes in Fullmetal Alchemist, Ladd Russo in Baccano, Hiroshi Nohara in Crayon Shin-chan, Leorio Paladiknight in Hunter x Hunter), dies at age 55.
 Danny Goldman, American actor and casting director (voice of Brainy Smurf in The Smurfs, Cartoon All-Stars to the Rescue and Robot Chicken), dies from complications of two strokes at age 80.
 April 13:
 Ann Sullivan, American animator (Walt Disney Animation Studios), dies from COVID-19 at age 91.
 Kevin Kocvar, Canadian film editor (Toad Patrol, Toot & Puddle, Jimmy Two-Shoes, Stella and Sam, Camp Lakebottom, Atomic Puppet, If You Give a Mouse a Cookie, Hilda), dies at age 56.
 April 15: Brian Dennehy, American actor (voice of Django in Ratatouille, Babe Ruth in Everyone's Hero), dies at age 81.
 April 16: Gene Deitch, American comics artist, animator and film director (Munro, Tom Terrific, Nudnik, Popeye, Tom & Jerry), dies at age 95.
 April 19: Ian Whitcomb, English entertainer, singer-songwriter, composer (Bugs Bunny: Superstar), record producer, writer, broadcaster and actor (voice of the Narrator in A Christmas Carol), dies from a stroke at age 78.
 April 20: Nick Rijgersberg, Canadian animator (It's Punky Brewster, The Nutcracker Prince, The Raccoons, The Ren & Stimpy Show, CINAR, What's with Andy?), storyboard artist (Inspector Gadget, Bob the Builder), overseas supervisor (Conan the Adventurer) and director (CINAR, Bratz: Starrin' & Stylin', Bratz: Passion 4 Fashion Diamondz), dies at age 60.
 April 24: Rob Gibbs, American animator (FernGully: The Last Rainforest, Cool World, Dinosaur), storyboard artist (Hyperion Pictures, Pixar, The Boss Baby, Snoopy Presents: To Mom (and Dad), With Love), writer and director (Cars Toons), dies at age 55.
 April 29: Irrfan Khan, Indian actor (Hindi dub speaking voice of Baloo in The Jungle Book), dies at age 53.

May
 May 8: Roy Horn, German-American magician, entertainer and producer (Father of the Pride), dies from COVID-19 at age 75.
 May 9:
 Little Richard, American rock musician (voiced himself in The Simpsons episode "Special Edna", performed the theme song of The Magic School Bus), dies at age 87.
 Richard Sala, American comics artist, illustrator and animator (made animation for Liquid Television), dies at age 61.
 May 10: Martin Pasko, Canadian-American comics writer and animation writer (Thundarr the Barbarian, Teenage Mutant Ninja Turtles, Batman: The Animated Series), dies at age 61.
 May 11: Jerry Stiller, American actor and comedian (voice of Uncle Max in The Lion King 1½, Pretty Boy in Teacher's Pet, Murray Weiner in How Murray Saved Christmas, Principal Stickler in Fish Hooks), dies at age 92.
 May 14: Dominic Orlando, American animator and storyboard artist (CatDog, Dora the Explorer, Holly Hobbie & Friends), dies at an unknown age.
 May 15: Fred Willard, American actor and comedian (voice of Officer Brown in King of the Hill, Dave Campbell in Family Guy, Dad in Monster House, Jack Hench in Kim Possible, Boogie Man in The Grim Adventures of Billy and Mandy, Melvin in Chicken Little, Mr. Doozy in Mickey Mouse Mixed-Up Adventures, Pop-Pop in The Loud House, Sammy Raymond in the Hey Arnold! episode "Rich Guy", F.R.E.D. in the Dexter's Laboratory episode "Lab on the Run", Wally Kogen in The Simpsons episode "Sunday, Cruddy Sunday"), dies at age 86.
 May 28: Bob Kulick, American guitarist and record producer (co-wrote the song "Sweet Victory" which was used in the SpongeBob SquarePants episode "Band Geeks"), dies from heart disease at age 70.
 May 30: Michael Angelis, English actor (narrator of Thomas & Friends), dies from a heart attack at age 76.

June
 June 6: Dan Danglo, American animator (Terrytoons, Famous Studios, Warner Bros. Animation, Hanna-Barbera), dies at age 95.
 June 7: Hubert Gagnon, Canadian actor (dub voice of Optimus Prime in Transformers, and Homer Simpson and Grampa Simpson in The Simpsons), dies at age 73.
 June 11: Mel Winkler, American actor (voice of Commissioner Henderson in Superman: The Animated Series, Lucius Fox in The New Batman Adventures, Johnny the snowman in Oswald), dies at age 78.
 June 19: Ian Holm, English actor (voice of Chef Skinner in Ratatouille, Pontius Pilate in The Miracle Maker), dies at age 88.
 June 26:
 Milton Glaser, American graphic designer (Mickey Mouse in Vietnam, character designer on Norman Normal), dies at age 91.
 Kelly Asbury, American storyboard artist (Walt Disney Animation Studios), screenwriter, actor (voice of Master of Ceremonies and Fiddlesworth in Shrek the Third, Red Goon Gnomes in Gnomeo & Juliet), author/illustrator and film director (Spirit: Stallion of the Cimarron, Shrek 2, Gnomeo and Juliet, Smurfs: The Lost Village, UglyDolls), dies at age 60.
 June 29: Carl Reiner, American actor, comedian, film director, and screenwriter (voice of Maz in Globehunters: An Around the World in 80 Days Adventure, Sarmoti in Father of the Pride, Murray in The Cleveland Show, Carl Reinoceros in Toy Story 4, Larry in Duck Duck Goose, Santa Claus in The Penguins of Madagascar and Shimmer and Shine, Captain Treasure Tooth in Jake and the Never Land Pirates, Shazam in the Justice League Action episode "Classic Rock (Shazam Slam: Part 1)", Henry in the Bob's Burgers episode "Father of the Bob"), dies at age 98.

July
 July 1: Marc Alberich Lluís, Spanish comics artist and animator, dies at age 49.
 July 6: Ennio Morricone, Italian composer (Around the World with Peynet's Lovers, Aida of the Trees), dies at age 91.
 July 7: Mike Kricfalusi, American actor and father of John Kricfalusi (voice of Mr. Höek and Staff Lobster in Ren & Stimpy "Adult Party Cartoon"), dies at age 90.
 July 8: Naya Rivera, American actress, singer and model (voice of Sparkle in The Naughty List, Catwoman in Batman: The Long Halloween, Lolo Fuentes in the American Dad! episode "The Unincludeds"), drowns at age 33.
 July 12: Nurhasanah Iskandar, Indonesian actress (dub voice of the title character in Doraemon), dies at age 62.
 July 16: Danilo Tolentino, American animator (Anastasia, Bartok the Magnificent, Eight Crazy Nights), storyboard artist (Marvel Animation, Adventures from the Book of Virtues, The Prince of Atlantis, The Life & Adventures of Santa Claus) and background artist (RoboCop: Alpha Commando, The Life & Adventures of Santa Claus, The Hunchback of Notre Dame II), dies at an unknown age.
 July 17: John Lewis, American politician and civil rights activist (voiced himself in the Arthur episode "Arthur Takes a Stand"), dies from pancreatic cancer at age 80.
 July 24: Regis Philbin, American television presenter (voice of Typhon in Hercules, Mabel in Shrek the Third, himself in The Simpsons, Family Guy, and Lilo & Stitch: The Series), dies at age 88.

August
 August 1: Tom Pollock, American studio executive and film producer (Alienators: Evolution Continues), dies from a heart attack at age 77.
 August 26: Joe Ruby, American animator, screenwriter (Walt Disney Animation Studios, Hanna-Barbera, DePatie-Freleng Enterprises) and animation producer (co-founder of Ruby-Spears Productions, co-creator of Scooby-Doo), dies at age 87.
 August 28: Chadwick Boseman, American actor (voice of T'Challa/Black Panther in What If...?), dies at age 43.
 August 30: Anatoliy Prokhorov, Russian animation producer (Kikoriki, founder of Petersburg Animation Studio and co-founder of Pilot), dies at age 72.
 August 31: Norm Spencer, Canadian actor (voice of Cyclops in X-Men), dies at age 62.

September
 September 4: Annie Cordy, Belgian singer, comedian and actress (dub voice of Mother Willow in Pocahontas), dies at age 92.
 September 11: Roger Carel, French actor (voice of Asterix and Dogmatix, French dub voice of Winnie-the-Pooh, Piglet, Rabbit, Mickey Mouse, Yogi Bear, Foghorn Leghorn, Fritz the Cat, and Flintheart Glomgold), dies at age 93.
 September 21: Ron Cobb, American cartoonist, animator, film set designer, TV director and scriptwriter (Walt Disney Animation Studios), dies at age 83.
 September 29: Helen Reddy, Australian-American singer and actress (portrayed Nora in Pete's Dragon, voiced herself in Family Guy), dies at age 78.
 September 30: Phil Walsh, American television producer and writer (Disney Television Animation, The Land Before Time, Pound Puppies, creator of Teamo Supremo), dies at an unknown age.

October
 October 12: Conchata Ferrell, American actress (voice of Roxanne in Duckman, Bob's Mom in Frankenweenie, Ma Munchapper in Buzz Lightyear of Star Command, Dr. Greer in The Zeta Project episode "The Next Gen", Miss Effluvium in the Lloyd in Space episode "Incident at Luna Vista"), dies at age 77.
 October 15: Martin Strudler, American animator and background designer (Warner Bros. Animation, Muppet Babies, Dungeons & Dragons, Wizards), dies at age 91.
 October 16: Mannix Bennett, American animator (An American Tail), background artist (Sullivan Bluth Studios, The Thief and the Cobbler, The Pink Panther, Rich Animation Studios, The Pagemaster, Earthworm Jim, The Hunchback of Notre Dame, Cats Don't Dance, Quest for Camelot, Scooby-Doo on Zombie Island, The Angry Beavers, Fantasia 2000, 101 Dalmatians II: Patch's London Adventure, Arthur Christmas, Hotel Transylvania) and visual effects artist (Digital Domain, Rhythm and Hues Studios), dies at an unknown age.
 October 21: Marge Champion, American dancer and actress (model for the title character in Snow White and the Seven Dwarfs, the Blue Fairy in Pinocchio, Hyacinth Hippo in Fantasia and Mr. Stork in Dumbo), dies at age 101.
 October 24: Dorris Bergstrom, American animator (Walt Disney Animation Studios, Hanna-Barbera, The U.S. of Archie, The Tom and Jerry Comedy Show, The Lord of the Rings, Warner Bros. Animation, The Grinch Grinches the Cat in the Hat, It's Flashbeagle, Charlie Brown, The Chipmunk Adventure), dies at age 97.
 October 27: Victor Lew, American visual effects artist (DreamWorks Animation), dies at age 38.
 October 31: Sean Connery, Scottish actor (voice of Draco in Dragonheart, and the title character in Sir Billi), dies at age 90.

November
 November 1: Barbera DeLiso, American xerographer (Pac-Man, The Swan Princess), dies at age 81.
 November 2:
 Elsa Raven, American actress (voice of Hannele in American Pop), dies at age 91.
 Tony Eastman, American animator (Sniz & Fondue, Saturday TV Funhouse, Between the Lions, Courage the Cowardly Dog, Harvey Birdman, Attorney at Law), storyboard artist (Beavis and Butt-Head, Beavis and Butt-Head Do America, Daria, Sheep in the Big City, I Spy, Codename: Kids Next Door) and director (Doug), dies at age 77.
 November 4: Sergio Matteucci, Italian actor and radio presenter (dub voice of Saiyan B in Dragon Ball Z, narrator in Dastardly and Muttley in Their Flying Machines), dies at age 89.
 November 5: Hana Kukal, Slovak-born Canadian animator (Atkinson Film-Arts, The Raccoons, FernGully: The Last Rainforest, Rupert, Lacewood Productions, Once Upon a Forest, Problem Child, Eight Crazy Nights, The Secret World of Benjamin Bear), storyboard artist (Stickin' Around, Hippo Tub Co., Pound Puppies, Almost Naked Animals, Daniel Tiger's Neighborhood, PAW Patrol) and director (Katie and Orbie, Dirtgirlworld), dies from cancer at age 59.
 November 6: Ken Spears, American animation writer, sound editor and producer (Hanna-Barbera, co-creator of Scooby-Doo, co-founder of Ruby-Spears Enterprises), dies at age 82.
 November 7: Norm Crosby, American actor and comedian (voice of Mr. Hayman in Buzz Lightyear of Star Command, the Judge in Eight Crazy Nights), dies from heart failure at age 93.
 November 8: Alex Trebek, Canadian-American game show host and television personality (voice of Alan Quebec in the Rugrats episode "Game Show Didi", Announcer in The Magic School Bus episode "Shows and Tells", Alex Lebek in the Arthur episode "Arthur and the Big Riddle", voiced himself in The Simpsons episodes "Miracle on Evergreen Terrace" and "Penny-Wiseguys", the Pepper Ann episodes "Unhappy Campers" and "The Finale", the Family Guy episode "I Take Thee Quagmire", and the Scooby-Doo and Guess Who? episode "Total Jeopardy"), dies from pancreatic cancer at age 80.
 November 9: Ro Marcenaro, Italian animator and comics artist, dies at age 83.
 November 15: Hikari Yoko, Japanese actress (Sailor Moon Crystal, Naruto: Shippuden), dies at age 46.
 November 16: David Hemblen, English-born Canadian actor (voice of Magneto in X-Men, Vault-Keeper in Tales from the Cryptkeeper, Asmodeus in Redwall, The Night Master in Yin Yang Yo!), dies at age 79.
 November 18:
 Jonas Rodrigues de Mello, Brazilian actor (voice of Shadowseat in Cassiopeia, Montanha in The Happy Cricket and the Giant Bugs, Brazilian dub voice of various villains in Dragon Ball Z and Rataxes in The Adventures of Babar), dies at age 83.
 Kirby Morrow, Canadian actor, writer and comedian (voice of Cyclops in X-Men: Evolution, Jay in Class of the Titans, Hot Shot in Transformers: Cybertron, Miroku in Inuyasha, Van Fanel in the Ocean dub of Escaflowne, Teru Mikami in Death Note, Trowa Barton in Mobile Suit Gundam Wing, Ryo Takatsuki in Project ARMS, Goku in the Ocean dub of Dragon Ball Z (from Episode 160 onwards), Cole in Ninjago), dies at age 47.
 Michel Robin, French actor (voice of Champion in Les Triplettes de Belleville), dies from COVID-19 at age 90.
 November 21: Malcolm Marmorstein, American film director and screenwriter (Pete's Dragon), dies from cancer at age 92.
 November 22: Changiz Jalilvand, Iranian actor (dub voice of Bert in Mary Poppins), dies from COVID-19 at age 80.
 November 30: Enrico Bertorelli, Italian actor (dub voice of Cell and Commander Red in Dragon Ball Z, James Gordon in Batman: The Animated Series), dies at age 78.
Specific date unknown: Alan Short, British animator (Arthur Christmas, Watership Down), dies at age 62.

December
 December 2:
 Richard Corben, American animator, illustrator, comics writer, comics artist (Neverwhere, wrote the script for the Den segment in Heavy Metal) and colorist, dies at age 80.
 Lester Pourier, American animator and layout artist (Hanna-Barbera, Garfield and Friends, Tom and Jerry: The Movie), dies at age 89.
 Cullen Blaine, American animator (Hanna-Barbera, Alvin and the Chipmunks, Denver, the Last Dinosaur, The Simpsons, Garfield and Friends, Nine Dog Christmas), storyboard artist (Hanna-Barbera. Ruby-Spears Enterprises, Marvel Productions, DIC Entertainment, Ghostbusters, The Berenstain Bears, Spiral Zone, Garfield and Friends, Teenage Mutant Ninja Turtles, Calico Entertainment, Animaniacs, Timon & Pumbaa, Hey Arnold!, The Magic School Bus, God, the Devil and Bob, Grandma Got Run Over by a Reindeer, Globehunters: An Around the World in 80 Days Adventure, Make Way for Noddy, Barbie: Fairytopia, Arthur's Missing Pal, Higglytown Heroes), sheet timer (Warner Bros. Animation, DIC Entertainment, Jetlag Productions, Life with Louie, Happily Ever After: Fairy Tales for Every Child, Disney Television Animation, Jumanji, Toonsylvania, Silver Surfer, Dora the Explorer, All Grown Up!, Tutenstein, The Secret Saturdays, G.I. Joe: Renegades), writer (The Pink Panther Show), producer (The Get Along Gang) and director (Return to the Planet of the Apes, DIC Entertainment, Garfield and Friends, Hey Arnold!, Disney Television Animation, Kid Notorious), dies at age 85.
 December 4: David Lander, American actor and comedian (voice of Smart Ass the Weasel in Who Framed Roger Rabbit, The Sewer King in Hey Arnold!, Doc-Boy Arbuckle in A Garfield Christmas Special and The Garfield Show, Horace Badun in 101 Dalmatians: The Series, Arthur in Jungle Cubs, Squiggy in The Simpsons episode "Helter Shelter"), dies at age 73.
 December 10: Tommy Lister Jr., American actor and professional wrestler (voice of Finnick in Zootopia, Mr. Mussels in Fish Hooks, Bobby in Regular Show, Filbert Slowlove in The Boondocks episode "The New Black"), dies at age 62.
 December 14: Alan Decker, American re-recording mixer (Dragon Tales, Jackie Chan Adventures, Max Steel, Harold and the Purple Crayon, The Simpsons), dies at age 69.
 December 17: Doug Crane, American comics artist and animator (Terrytoons, Hanna-Barbera, Filmation, Spider-Man, Heavy Metal, Beavis and Butt-Head), dies at age 85.
 December 20: Chad Stuart, English singer and actor (voice of Flaps in The Jungle Book), dies at age 80.
 December 21: Aleksandr Kurlyandsky, Russian animation screenwriter (Well, Just You Wait!) and author, dies at age 82.
 December 22: Tuck Tucker, American animator (Filmation, The Little Mermaid, The Simpsons, Rugrats, The Ren & Stimpy Show), storyboard artist (ALF: The Animated Series, Alf Tales, 2 Stupid Dogs, Klasky Csupo, Nickelodeon Animation Studio, Cartoon Network Studios, Looney Tunes, Family Guy, All Hail King Julien), sheet timer (Clarence), writer (SpongeBob SquarePants, Camp Lazlo) and director (Nickelodeon Animation Studio, Drawn Together), dies at age 59.
 December 29: Claude Bolling, French composer (Daisy Town, The Ballad of the Daltons), dies at age 90.
 December 30:
 Brenda Banks, American animator (Ruby-Spears Enterprises, Hanna-Barbera, Looney Tunes, This Is America, Charlie Brown, The Pagemaster, The Simpsons, King of the Hill), dies at age 72.
 Dawn Wells, American actress (voice of Mary Ann Summers and Ginger Grant in Gilligan's Planet, Gumbalina Toothington in The Epic Tales of Captain Underpants episode "The Ghastly Danger of the Ghost Dentist"), dies at age 82.
 December 31: Taran Kootenhayoo, Canadian actor (voice of Randall in Molly of Denali''), dies of leukemia cancer at age 27.

See also
 2020 in anime
 List of animated television series of 2020

References

External links 
Animated works of the year, listed in the IMDb

 
Mass media timelines by year
Animation